La Línea: Shadow of Narco is a 2020 docuseries in Spanish that aired on Netflix. It is a 4 part documentary about drug smuggling in Spain.

Story 
It is about a drug-smuggling hotspot in La Linea: Shadow of Narco, about a troubled city in Spain. La Linea de la Concepcion sits in the shadow of the rock of Gibraltar, a natural wonder that serves as a backdrop to countless boats smuggling drugs from Morocco into Europe. This series tags along with law officers trying in vain to enforce the law.

Episodes

Release 
La Línea: Shadow of Narco was released on September 9, 2020, on Netflix.

References

External links 
 
 

Netflix original documentary television series
True crime television series
Spanish-language Netflix original programming